The 1976–77 season is Real Madrid Club de Fútbol's 74th season in existence and the club's 45th consecutive season in the top flight of Spanish football.

Summary 
During summer the club failed to replace ageing Gunter Netzer with Brazilian midfielder Zico from Flamengo or English Forward Kevin Keegan from Liverpool F.C. both offers rejected by their teams. The club collapsed to the 9th place in the most disastrous League campaign under Bernabeu Presidency era finishing 12 points below Champions Atlético Madrid despite the arrival of international Danish striker Henning Jensen from Borussia Mönchengladbach. However, even with the chaotic club performance, head coach Miljan Miljanić remained in his position and was ratified by President Santiago Bernabéu on 7 June 1977

Shockingly, in European Cup the squad was defeated by Belgian squad Club Brugge after a 0–0 draw in Valencia, the team lost 0–2 in Brugge being the last away trip of Santiago Bernabéu with the squad.

The club was early eliminated in 1976–77 Copa del Rey Third Round by underdogs Hércules CF.

Squad

Transfers

Friendlies

Competitions

La Liga

Position by round

League table

Matches

Copa del Rey

Third round

European Cup

First round

Second round

Statistics

Players statistics

References

External links 
 BDFútbol

Real Madrid CF seasons
Real Madrid